The Duffy-Herreshoff DH30 watertaxi is an 18-person hydrogen fueled passenger ship, power-assisted by an electric motor that gets its electricity from a fuel cell. The watertaxi debuted on October 20, 2003 in San Francisco.

Refueling
A 3 kW Hydrogen on demand system.

Specifications

See also
 Hydrogen ship
 Hydrogen vehicle
 Hydrogen economy

References

External links
Duffy

Hydrogen ships
Passenger ships